Laghman University is a state university located in Mihtarlam, Laghman Province, in eastern Afghanistan. It was established in 2011. Laghman University has 72 bachelor's and master's degree teachers in five faculties.

Faculties
★Engineering Faculty

★Agriculture Faculty have five departments (forestry and environmental science, plant protection, horticulture, agri extension and economic and agranomy 

★Human Sciences and Literature

★Education faculty

★ Economics Faculty

See also 
List of universities in Afghanistan
Education in Afghanistan

References

Universities in Afghanistan
University
Education in Afghanistan